Graphorkis is a genus of flowering plants from the orchid family, Orchidaceae. It contains 4 known species, native to Africa and to Madagascar and other islands of the Indian Ocean.

See also
 List of Orchidaceae genera

References

  (1809) Nouveau Bulletin des Sciences, publié par la Société Philomatique de Paris 1: 318.
  2005. Handbuch der Orchideen-Namen. Dictionary of Orchid Names. Dizionario dei nomi delle orchidee. Ulmer, Stuttgart
  (2009) Epidendroideae (Part two). Genera Orchidacearum 5: 71 ff. Oxford University Press.

External links

Eulophiinae genera
Eulophiinae